Anzor Akhmedovich Ashev (born 28 January 1998) is a Russian football player. He plays for FC Druzhba Maykop.

Club career
He made his debut in the Russian Professional Football League for FC Druzhba Maykop on 3 April 2016 in a game against FC SKA Rostov-on-Don.

He made his Russian Football National League debut for FC Armavir on 29 July 2019 in a game against FC Spartak-2 Moscow.

References

External links
 Profile by Russian Professional Football League

1998 births
People from Koshekhablsky District
Living people
Russian footballers
Association football midfielders
Association football forwards
FC Armavir players
FC SKA Rostov-on-Don players
FC Chernomorets Novorossiysk players
Sportspeople from Adygea